Forbush Lake is a lake on Vancouver Island southwest of Comox Lake.

References

Alberni Valley
Lakes of Vancouver Island
Nelson Land District